The 1925 Saint Louis Billikens football team was an American football team that represented Saint Louis University as an independent during the 1925 college football season. In its third season under head coach Dan J. Savage, the team compiled a 2–6–1 record. The team played its home games at St. Louis University Field in St. Louis. Frank Ramaciotti was the team captain.

Schedule

References

Saint Louis
Saint Louis Billikens football seasons
Saint Louis Billikens football